Niokolo-Koba Airport  is an airstrip serving the Niokolo-Koba National Park in Senegal.

See also
Transport in Senegal

References

  Great Circle Mapper - Niokolo-Koba
 Google Earth

Airports in Senegal